Shilat is a moshav partially in Israel and partially in the Latrun salient of the Green Line. Located around a kilometre north of Modi'in, it falls under the jurisdiction of Hevel Modi'in Regional Council.

The Shilat Junction, at the intersection of Route 443 and Route 446, is the main northern entrance to Modi'in and the site of an industrial park which houses many commercial establishments as well as light industry.

History
The moshav was established in July 1977 by 25 families on land that had belonged the Palestinian village of Shilta, which was depopulated in 1948. After the Six-Day War in 1967, Israel confiscated  781 dunams of land from the Palestinian village of Saffa for the construction of Shilat.

References

External links
Official website 

Moshavim
Populated places established in 1977
Populated places in Central District (Israel)
1977 establishments in Israel